Robert Lyle may refer to:

Robert Lyle (Minnesota politician), American politician
Robert Lyle, 1st Lord Lyle (died 1470)
Robert Lyle, 2nd Lord Lyle (died 1497)
Bobby Lyle (born 1944), American jazz musician
Robert Lyle of the Lyle baronets

See also
Robert Lyles (born 1961), American football player